Mirbelia platylobioides  is a flowering plant in the family Fabaceae. It is a small, prostrate plant with trailing stems, yellow and red pea flowers and ovate leaves. It is endemic to New South Wales.

Description
The flowers are more or less sessile borne in small groups or rarely singly in leaf axils or at the end of branches.

Taxonomy
This species was first formally described in 1825 by Augustin Pyramus de Candolle who gave it the name Chorizema platyloboides in Prodromus Systematis Naturalis Regni Vegetabilis. In 1958 Joy Thompson changed the name to Mirbelia platylobioides and the change was published in Proceedings of the Linnean Society of New South Wales.

Distribution and habitat
This mirbelia grows in open woodland in heath and sandy soils south from Rylstone, in the Southern Highlands, Blue Mountains to Eden.

References

platylobioides
Fabales of Australia
Flora of New South Wales
Taxa named by Augustin Pyramus de Candolle
Plants described in 1825